Ayoub Barraj (born 27 May 1997) is a Tunisian freestyle wrestler. At the African Wrestling Championships he won a total of four medals: three gold medals and one bronze medal.

Career 

He represented Tunisia at the 2014 Summer Youth Olympics in Nanjing, China without winning a medal. He finished in fifth place in the boys' freestyle 76kg event. In 2015, he won one of the bronze medals in the 74 kg event at the African Wrestling Championships held in Alexandria, Egypt.

In 2018, he won the gold medal in the 74 kg event at the African Wrestling Championships held in Port Harcourt, Nigeria. He also won the gold medal in the 79 kg event in 2019 and 2020.

He represented Tunisia at the 2019 African Games held in Rabat, Morocco and he won the gold medal in the men's freestyle 86 kg event. In the final, he defeated Fateh Benferdjallah of Algeria. In the same year, he also competed in the men's freestyle 79 kg event at the 2019 World Wrestling Championships held in Nur-Sultan, Kazakhstan where he was eliminated in his first match by Tajmuraz Salkazanov of Slovakia. Salkazanov went on to win one of the bronze medals.

In 2020, he competed in the men's 79 kg event at the Individual Wrestling World Cup held in Belgrade, Serbia. In 2021, he competed at the African & Oceania Olympic Qualification Tournament hoping to qualify for the 2020 Summer Olympics in Tokyo, Japan. He did not qualify as he lost his first match against Augusto Midana of Guinea-Bissau. He also failed to qualify for the Olympics at the World Olympic Qualification Tournament held in Sofia, Bulgaria.

Major results

References

External links 
 

Living people
1997 births
Place of birth missing (living people)
Tunisian male sport wrestlers
African Games gold medalists for Tunisia
African Games medalists in wrestling
Competitors at the 2019 African Games
Wrestlers at the 2014 Summer Youth Olympics
African Wrestling Championships medalists
20th-century Tunisian people
21st-century Tunisian people